A semantic class contains words that share a semantic feature.  For example within nouns there are two sub classes, concrete nouns and abstract nouns. The concrete nouns include people, plants, animals, materials and objects while the abstract nouns refer to concepts such as qualities, actions, and processes. According to the nature of the noun, they are categorized into different semantic classes. Semantic classes may intersect. The intersection of female and young can be girl.

See also
 Semantic property
 Categorization
 Semantic field

References
 
 

Semantics

es:Campo semántico
fr:Classe sémantique
kk:Семантикалық өріс
ru:Семантическое поле
ta:சொற்பொருள் வகுப்பு